Sheila Shulman (18 October 1936 – 25 October 2014) was a rabbi in London, England. She was born in Brooklyn, and earned a master's degree in English and Comparative Literature in the 1960s at the City University of New York. She first travelled to England on a fellowship in 1967.

Along with Elizabeth Tikvah Sarah, she was one of the first openly lesbian graduates of the Leo Baeck College. Shulman was ordained in 1989. In 1990 Shulman and a group of lesbian feminists founded London's inclusive synagogue, Beit Klal Yisrael, of which she became rabbi. In addition to her work there, since her ordination she worked at Finchley Reform Synagogue, initially part-time, then for some years as half-time Associate Rabbi, then part-time again. She also taught at Leo Baeck College-Centre for Jewish Education as a part-time Lecturer in Jewish Thought.

References

1936 births
2014 deaths
Lesbian feminists
LGBT rabbis
Women rabbis
Alumni of Leo Baeck College